Indra Chandra Shastri was an Indian writer and philosopher from Bikaner in Rajasthan state in India. The government of India issued a postage stamp in his honour.

References 
Commemorative postage stamp on Indra Chandra Shastri 

People from Bikaner
Scholars from Rajasthan
Postage stamps of India